La Crescent is a city in Houston and Winona counties in the U.S. state of Minnesota. The population was 5,276 at the 2020 census.

La Crescent is located in the northeast portion of Houston County; the northern edge of the city falls into Winona County. The city is known as the "Apple Capital of Minnesota" because John S. Harris planted the first apple trees in the midwest here, resulting in many orchards in the present-day city. It is recognized as a 'Tree City' by the Arbor Day Foundation, and a 'Minnesota GreenStep City' by the Minnesota Pollution Control Agency.

History
Lying on the west bank of the Mississippi River, the city is surrounded by bluffs with views of the river and abundant wildlife. Humans have inhabited this area for thousands of years. The most recent inhabitants before the arrival of white settlers were the Dakota people, a branch of the Sioux, and the Ho-Chunk, or Winnebago.

Following the 1803 Louisiana Purchase, Nathan Boone, youngest son of Daniel Boone, was among the early surveyors of this area. The various Indian tribes who had lived here were forced out and relocated in the 1840s to accommodate white settlement.

La Crescent was founded in 1851 by Peter and Emma Cameron, who called it "Camerons". The Camerons were two of the town's most colorful characters; he tried to dig a canal to change the flow of the Mississippi River so it would flow closer to La Crescent and bypass La Crosse, Wisconsin across the river. He died 10 weeks before its scheduled completion in 1857, and the canal was never finished, although the canal can still be seen in aerial photographs of the city. The Presbyterian missionary Sheldon Jackson lived in La Crescent prior to 1872, when he moved westward to Denver and later Alaska.

The second name of La Crescent was "Manton", named by William and Harvey Gillett, after they cleared the downtown area for settlement for Peter Cameron. In quick succession, the name of the town was changed again by a somewhat unscrupulous land speculation venture, the Kentucky Land Company. They wanted a more romantic-sounding name for the town to attract settlers and came up with "La Crescent", after the bend or "crescent" shape of the Mississippi River around the town. La Crescent incorporated in 1857.

John S. Harris arrived in La Crescent in 1856 and over a number of years gave the town its identity of "Apple Capital of Minnesota", a title that the city copyrighted in 2002. Despite the belief of "99 out of 100 people that apples could not grow in Minnesota", Harris planted the area's first apple trees in 1857, experimenting until he grew trees hardy enough to withstand the severe Minnesota winters. He planted thousands of apple trees and hundreds of varieties, a full half of which he said were total failures. Harris became known as "Father of the Orchardists" in Minnesota, and was a founding member of the Minnesota State Horticultural Society. Since 1948 La Crescent has celebrated this apple heritage annually with a weekend festival known as Applefest.

La Crescent has entertained a number of businesses throughout its history, but the one that has endured the longest is the apple industry. Around the 1940s La Crescent had about 40 small orchards in and around the city. Although the number of orchards has dwindled to less than a dozen, the area is about the same, as the orchards have been expanded in the bluffs west of the city. La Crescent grows gourmet apple varieties not found in most other places. Most of its apples are sold in Minnesota; the rest are shipped to surrounding states and Canada. Honey and other organic products are sold in La Crescent as well as apples. The area hosts outdoor activities including biking, hiking, fishing, bird watching, skiing, snowmobiling, and fourwheeling.

Geography

La Crescent sits three miles southwest across the Mississippi River from Onalaska, Wisconsin and west of the northern part of La Crosse. Winona, Minnesota is 21 miles to the northwest of La Crescent. It is the largest city in Houston County and the second largest in Winona County.

Bluffs
La Crescent is known for having more bluffs than most Minnesota cities. It lies on the side of a large bluff, with other large hills within the city. Since La Crescent is below the normal level of the rest of the area, the bluffside provides some protection from winds.

Lake
La Crescent sits next to Blue Lake, which the US Fish and Wildlife Service lists as a high quality wetland, due to its diverse species, with year-round fishing. Most visible around the lake are migratory bird species such as Wood Ducks, Ruddy Ducks, Hooded Mergansers, Least and American Bitterns, Common Morrhends, Night Herons, Sandhill Cranes, and Tundra Swans. In the early spring, the water appears clear, before  natural aquatic vegetation grows over.

Demographics

2010 census
As of the census of 2010, there were 4,830 people, 2,012 households, and 1,370 families in the city. The racial makeup of the city was 96.5% White, 0.8% African American, 0.1% Native American, 0.6% Asian, 0.1% from other races, and 1.8% from two or more races. Hispanic or Latino of any race were 1.1% of the population.

There were 2,012 households, of which 30.7% had children under the age of 18 living with them, 55.2% were married couples living together, 10.0% had a female householder with no husband present, 2.9% had a male householder with no wife present, and 31.9% were non-families. 27.1% of all households were made up of individuals, and 12% had someone living alone who was 65 years of age or older. The average household size was 2.37 and the average family size was 2.86.

The median age in the city was 42.8 years. 23.5% of residents were under the age of 18; 6.8% were between the ages of 18 and 24; 22.7% were from 25 to 44; 30.4% were from 45 to 64; and 16.6% were 65 years of age or older. The gender makeup of the city was 47.7% male and 52.3% female.

2000 census
As of the census of 2000, there were 4,923 people, 1,940 households, and 1,367 families in the city. The racial makeup of the city was 97.60% White, 0.43% African American, 0.08% Native American, 0.87% Asian, 0.08% from other races, and 0.93% from two or more races. Hispanic or Latino of any race were 0.73% of the population.

There were 1,940 households, out of which 35.0% had children under the age of 18 living with them, 59.1% were married couples living together, 8.8% had a female householder with no husband present, and 29.5% were non-families. 26.0% of all households were made up of individuals, and 11.3% had someone living alone who was 65 years of age or older.  The average household size was 2.49 and the average family size was 3.02.

The city population contained 27.3% under the age of 18, 7.1% from 18 to 24, 28.6% from 25 to 44, 21.2% from 45 to 64, and 15.8% above age 64. The median age was 38 years. For every 100 females, there were 92.9 males. For every 100 females over age 17, there were 89.1 males.

The median income for a household in the city was $45,433, and the median income for a family was $54,708. Males had a median income of $40,316 versus $24,308 for females. The per capita income for the city was $21,361.  About 0.8% of families and 3.9% of the population were below the poverty line, including 1.9% of those under age 18 and 12.8% of those above age 64.

Education
The La Crescent–Hokah Public Schools is the city's largest public school district, and Melinda Crowley is superintendent (February 2023). It includes La Crescent–Hokah Elementary School and La Crescent–Hokah Secondary School. The other public school district, La Crescent Montessori Academy & STEM school, serves grades pre-k-12th grade under Director Melissa Johnson. Other educational opportunities include the private school Crucifixion Catholic Elementary. The La Crescent Public Library serves the local community.

Notable people
 Siri Carpenter (born 1971), science journalist, editor
Connor Franta (born 1992), YouTuber, entrepreneur, entertainer, and writer
 Eriah Hayes (born 1988), professional hockey player, current boys hockey coach at LCHS
 Sheldon Jackson (1834–1909), Presbyterian minister, missionary, political leader
 Marguerite Kerrigan (born 1931), All-American Girls Professional Baseball League player
 Peter Pernin Pastor (1878-1886), survivor and memoirist of the Peshtigo fire
 Michelle Rifenberg (born 1957), Minnesota politician 
 Ken Tschumper (born 1950), Minnesota politician and farmer
 Al W. Wieser, Jr. (born 1949), Minnesota state legislator and businessman

Infrastructure

Transportation
U.S. Highways 14 and 61; and Minnesota State Highway 16 serve as main routes in the community. The northern edge of La Crescent is skirted by Interstate 90 and I-90 Mississippi River Bridge. The Great River Road, a collection of state and local roads that follow the course of the Mississippi River, passes through La Crescent via US 61 and a short piece of MN 16.

Bus service to La Crosse is operated by La Crosse MTU and has 13 trips daily through La Crescent.

A pedestrian pathway known as the Wagon Wheel Trail connects La Crescent and most notably Mississippi River Trail to La Crosse and several trails in the Wisconsin bike trail system, notably the Great River Trail.

References

External links

 City of La Crescent
 La Crescent-Hokah School District
 La Crescent Montessori Academy & STEM School

Cities in Minnesota
Minnesota populated places on the Mississippi River
Cities in Houston County, Minnesota
Cities in Winona County, Minnesota